They Met in Argentina is a 1941 American film directed by Leslie Goodwins and Jack Hively for RKO Pictures. Hively had to come in and finish the picture after Goodwins was hospitalized for pneumonia. Maureen O'Hara plays an Argentinian who falls in love with a Texan (James Ellison), who is attempting to buy a racehorse from her father. It was one of a number of Hollywood films from the 1940s produced to reflect America's "Good Neighbor policy" towards Latin American countries. They Met in Argentina was not well received by audiences, critics, or the Argentine government.

Plot
Tim Kelly (James Ellison) is a Texan in the oil business who travels to Argentina to bid for some land. When his bid is unsuccessful, he teams up with colleague Duke Ferrell (Buddy Ebsen) to buy their employer a successful racehorse, Lucero, in the hope that this will compensate for the failed bid. Tim falls in love with Lolita O'Shea (Maureen O'Hara), the daughter of the racehorse's owner, Don Enrique (Robert Barrat). Don Enrique is against selling Lucero, but when he realises his daughter is in love with Tim, he offers him the racehorse on the condition that he immediately returns to the USA. When Lolita realises Tim has left, she pursues him on horseback.

Cast
 Maureen O'Hara as Lolita O'Shea
 James Ellison as Tim Kelly
 Alberto Vila as Alberto Delmonte
 Buddy Ebsen as Duke Ferrel
 Robert Barrat as Don Enrique de los Santos O'Shea
 Joseph Buloff as Santiago, O'Shea's Trainer
 Diosa Costello as Panchita

Background and production
In the early 1940s, Hollywood studios produced a number of films which reflected America's "Good Neighbor policy" towards Latin America; They Met in Argentina was one of RKO Pictures' contributions. With these films set in Latin American countries, the studios hoped to both attract an audience in Latin America and to increase popular interest in the region among a North American audience. Other films of this nature included the Twentieth-Century Fox productions Down Argentine Way (1940) and Blood and Sand (1941).

They Met in Argentina was based on a story by Lou Brock, who was also the film's producer. Brock approached Rodgers and Hart to score the production. The pair wrote 12 songs in total, although only 7 of them were included in the final cut. The songs featured in the soundtrack are "You've Got the Best of Me", "North America Meets South America", "Amarillo", "Lolita", "Cutting the Cane", "Never Go To Argentina" and "Simpatica". The dance sequences were choreographed by Frank Veloz.

When Goodwins was hospitalized for pneumonia during production, RKO brought in veteran director Jack Hively to replace him and finish the film.

Reception

Box office
The film fared poorly in cinemas, and made a loss of $270,000.

Critical
The film received negative reviews from critics, with Robert Dana in the New York Herald Tribune describing it as "an American musical at its worst". Film critic Leonard Maltin later described it as a "dismal musical". The Argentine government spoke out against the distribution of the film in Latin America.

References

External links
 They Met in Argentina at IMDb
 
 
 

1941 films
Films directed by Leslie Goodwins
Films directed by Jack Hively
American musical films
1941 musical films
American black-and-white films
1940s American films
1940s English-language films